Sergei Gimayev (born 16 February 1984) is a Russian former professional ice hockey player who played in the Kontinental Hockey League (KHL). He was selected by Ottawa Senators in the 5th round (166th overall) of the 2003 NHL Entry Draft.

Gimayev made his Kontinental Hockey League debut playing with Barys Astana during the inaugural 2008–09 KHL season.

After making 8 appearances with HC Kunlun Red Star during the 2020–21 season, Gimayev announced his immediate retirement after 20 professional seasons on 25 January 2021.

Career statistics

Regular season and playoffs

International

References

External links

1984 births
Living people
Barys Nur-Sultan players
HC CSKA Moscow players
Dinamo Riga players
HC Dynamo Moscow players
HC Kunlun Red Star players
HC Sibir Novosibirsk players
Ice hockey people from Moscow
Ottawa Senators draft picks
Russian ice hockey defencemen
Salavat Yulaev Ufa players
Severstal Cherepovets players
HC Vityaz players